Zach Ashton is a self-taught musician, recording artist and producer. His musical genres include pop, bossa nova, jazz, reggae and acoustic pop. He is noted for using elements of world music within his compositions.

Discography

Albums
 Mellow Dia (2004)
 Sweet Nothings (2005)
 Marley Rendition (2006)
 Sugar And Spice – Various Tracks (2006)
 Just Like Beautiful (2008)
 The Distance Between Us (2011)
 People & Places (2016)

Soundtracks
 2004 Hang – Longboard Surf Film
 2004 Fox Fuel TV
 2007 Sete Pecados Rede Globo
 2007 Malhação Rede Globo
 2010 Passione Rede Globo

Compilations
 Sete Pecados International Soundtrack (2007) – "Sugar & Spice" Rede Globo
 Malhação Internacional (2007), vol. 2 – "Losing"  Som Livre
 "I Really Want You" (2008) – "Small Towns" Warner Music Group
 "Passione" International Soundtrack (2010) – "Say"  Rede Globo

External links

References

Living people
American male singer-songwriters
American acoustic guitarists
American male guitarists
American folk guitarists
American folk singers
American pop musicians
Smith, Zachary Ashton
Surf musicians
Year of birth missing (living people)
Place of birth missing (living people)
People from Clearwater, Florida
Singer-songwriters from Florida
Guitarists from Florida